G3: Rockin' in the Free World is a double live album by the G3 project that was recorded at The Uptown Theater in Kansas City, Missouri, USA, on October 21, 2003. The album featured the touring lineup of the project leader Joe Satriani, frequent member Steve Vai and guest guitarist Yngwie Malmsteen. A DVD of the same tour, but with a different track list, was released as G3: Live in Denver.

Track listing

Disc 1

Joe Satriani
All songs written by Joe Satriani.
"The Extremist" - 3:53
"Crystal Planet" - 4:41
"Always with Me, Always with You" - 4:16
"Midnight" - 3:05
"The Mystical Potato Head Groove Thing" - 5:31

Steve Vai
All songs written by Steve Vai.
"You're Here" - 3:33
"Reaping" - 7:05
"Whispering a Prayer" - 9:27

Yngwie Malmsteen
All songs written by Yngwie Malmsteen except where noted.
"Blitzkrieg" - 2:50
"Trilogy Suite Op.5, the First Movement" - 8:07
"Red House" (Jimi Hendrix) - 4:25
"Fugue (Concerto Suite for Electric Guitar and Orchestra in E Flat Minor Op.1)" - 3:37
"Finale" - 2:54

Disc 2

The G3 Jam
All songs written by Jimi Hendrix except where noted.
"Voodoo Child (Slight Return)" - 10:46
"Little Wing" - 6:08
"Rockin' in the Free World" (Neil Young) - 12:29

Personnel

Joe Satriani
 Joe Satriani - lead guitar, vocals, keyboard
 Galen Henson - rhythm guitar
 Matt Bissonette - bass guitar
 Jeff Campitelli - drums

Steve Vai
 Steve Vai - lead guitar, vocals
 Dave Weiner - rhythm guitar
 Billy Sheehan - bass guitar
 Tony MacAlpine - keyboards, lead guitar
 Jeremy Colson - drums

Yngwie Malmsteen
 Yngwie Malmsteen - lead guitar, vocals
 Mick Cervino - bass guitar
 Joakim Svalberg - keyboards
 Patrick Johansson - drums

References

G3 (tour) albums
Steve Vai albums
Collaborative albums
Joe Satriani live albums
2004 live albums
Yngwie Malmsteen live albums
Epic Records live albums
Live rock albums